Giovanni Ludovico Bianconi  (1717 in Bologna – 1781 in Perugia), was an Italian doctor and antiquarian, a multi-facetted scholar who was mentor and correspondent of the connoisseur and early art historian, Johann Joachim Winckelmann. Bianconi was doctor at the court of Joseph Ignaz Philipp von Hessen-Darmstadt, Prince-Bishop of Augsburg, from 1744 and councillor to Augustus III, Elector of Saxony, at Dresden.

His Scritti tedeschi (1763) sent from Dresden to Marchese Filippo Hercolani and to Francesco Algarotti, described the assembly and furnishing of the Electoral paintings gallery, with which Algarotti had been closely concerned; the collection formed the nucleus of the Gemäldegalerie at Dresden, initiated with the block purchase of some hundred paintings from the Este collection, Modena, in 1745— which Bianconi enriched with the purchase of Raphael's Sistine Madonna in 1753— These Scritti tedeschi were edited and set in their historical context by Giovanna Perini (Argelato, 1998).

Bianconi's connections were strongest in Bologna, even among picture dealers who were his rivals in supplying Dresden,  and in Florence, through Ignazio Hugford.

In the changed atmosphere and straightened finances following the Seven Years' War, Bianconi found it time to return to Italy, where he spent the rest of his career.

Among his published work were a book on Piranesi (1779), Anton Raphael Mengs (1780) and the disquisition on the Baths of Caracalla, Descrizione dei circhi particolarmente di quello di Caracalla (published posthumously, 1789). He also published extensively Winckelmann's reports from Herculaneum.

Early biographies were Mariotti, Delle lodi di L. B., (Perugia), 1781, and Sassoli, Della vita e delle opere di Giovanni Ludovico Bianconi, Bologna, 1885.

His brother Carlo Bianconi, a neoclassical painter of some reputation,  served as secretary to the Accademia di belle arti, at the Brera, Milan.

Further reading
Delle Lodi del Signor Consigliere Gio. Lodovico Bianconi. Perugia: Riginaldi, 1781. 39 p.

Scritti di Giovanni Ludovico Bianconi

Notes

18th-century Italian physicians
1717 births
1781 deaths
Italian art historians